George Ryder may refer to:
George Lisle Ryder (1838–1905), British civil servant
George Ryder Stakes
George Ryder, character in The Listener
George Ryder (footballer) for Durban City F.C.